Tadeusz Zieliński (15 March 1946 – 26 August 1977) was a Polish middle-distance runner. He competed in the men's 3000 metres steeplechase at the 1972 Summer Olympics.

References

External links

1946 births
1977 deaths
Athletes (track and field) at the 1972 Summer Olympics
Polish male middle-distance runners
Polish male steeplechase runners
Olympic athletes of Poland
20th-century Polish people